The Arcana Chronicles is the New York Times bestselling young adult fantasy series written by American author Kresley Cole and published by Valkyrie Press and Simon & Schuster. The main protagonist is Evie Greene.

Books
 Poison Princess. Simon & Schuster. October 2012 [2012]. .
 Endless Knight. Simon & Schuster. October 2013 [2013]. .
 Dead of Winter. Simon & Schuster. January 2015 [2015]. .
 Day Zero (novella) Valkyrie Press. August 2016 [2016]. .
 Arcana Rising. Valkyrie Press. August 2016 [2016]. .
 The Dark Calling Valkyrie Press. February 2018 [2018].. 
 From The Grave - Out 4-2023

References

Young adult fantasy novels
American fantasy novel series
2010s fantasy novels
American novel series